Dean O'Brien, known by his stage name Mr Yipadee or Deano Yipadee, is a children's author, musician, and producer, who has performed in New Zealand, Australia and the United Kingdom.

Early life
O'Brien was raised in Mosgiel, New Zealand, where he was educated at St Mary's Catholic primary school and Taieri High School. He became interested in performing music from an early age, and he played guitar in a number of bands in school. He also spent a year in Japan teaching English through music to young children. He began working in radio, initially for More FM in New Zealand, and then for 6 years on breakfast shows in Manchester, Liverpool, and Lancashire in England. He then spent over 4 years as the Programme Director for a radio station in Manchester, England. He was made redundant in 2012.

It was reported (incorrectly) in the Sydney Morning Herald after his Debut album went to Number One in the UK that O'Brien is from Melbourne, Australia.

Music career
After being made redundant, O'Brien decided to pursue a career writing and performing children's music, using the stage name Mr Yipadee. His music is intended to promote positive thinking and self-confidence among children. His first performances were at birthday parties and children's play centres near his home in Preston, England.

He has released four albums under the name Mr Yipadee, The Animal Choir, about a mouse starting a choir, The Yes I Can Club., "Positively Nursery Rhymes", and World's Greatest Christmas Party.  Yes I Can Club charted at number one on the iTunes Children's Best Sellers Chart in the UK when it was released. and World's Greatest Christmas was at number two on the Best Sellers Chart in December 2014.

In 2013, Mr Yipadee performed on the Kidz Field stage at Glastonbury Festival. After his performance, his debut album The Animal Choir peaked at number one on the iTunes children's chart. In September and October 2013, he toured New Zealand with fellow children's entertainer Craig Smith.  He has also toured the UK between 2013 and 2016 with CBeebies presenter, Alex Winters., CBeebies TV actor, Joe Chambers who plays First Officer Ditti on CBeebies TV Show, The Rhyme Rocket, Let's Play (CBeebies) presenter Rebecca Keatley  and Cat Sandion 

In 2015. O'Brien organised a dozen TV Stars to create an album called "Sing Along For Syria,  this album included kids to stars from CBeebies, CITV, CBBC, and  a star from iTV's Coronation Street.

Author career
In 2016, under the name Deano Yipadee,  O'Brien's first children's book Jingle Bells, Rudolph Smells was released by publishing house Scholastic. and debuted at number one on the best sellers children's charts  and although it was only released in the last quarter of 2016 was number five in overall 2016 New Zealand Children's books best sellers list.  It also reached the top 10 of all genre of books in Australia in the Collins Booksellers Best Sellers List in 2017.  This book was taken from the song Smelly Christmas.  This song was on the World's Greatest Christmas Party album that went to number two on the UK children's charts.  "Jingle Bells, Rudolph Smells" is illustrated by Paul Beavis and Gruffalo's Alex Scheffler.

Deano Yipadee's second book, Nee Naw The Little Fire Engine, debuted in the top 3 in the best sellers charts in the first week of February. It remained in the top 10 for over three months  and also made the Collins Booksellers Top 10 Best Sellers List in September 2017.

His third book, Stink-o-saurus, reached the top 3 in the best sellers charts in October and November 2017. and also topped the Collins Booksellers Top 10 Best Sellers List in Australia.

In 2018, Deano Yipadee has had three books in the top 5 in the same weeks in the Collins Booksellers Australian Best Sellers Charts in March and The New Zealand best sellers charts in April.

In 2019, Deano Yipadee had his books released in 21 countries by Scholastic Asia, Scholastic Canada, Scholastic UK and New Frontier publishing.

In 2020, Deano released the third book in the Scholastic bestselling book series Nee Naw The Little Fire Engine, called Nee Naw Goes Bananas.

In 2021, Deano released two books with Scholastic.  The first in April is 'Nee Naw And Friends - Ellie Copter', the fourth book in the Nee Naw The Little Fire Engine Series and the first that introduces a helicopter called Ellie.  Ellie Copter spent three months in the top 10 of the Children & Teens Best Sellers Charts.  The second book is called 'Jingle Bells, What's That Smell' was release in October and  spent two months in the top 10 of the Children And Teens best sellers charts in the weeks leading up to Christmas, 2021.

Personal life

O'Brien married Lani in Wanaka in February 2010. They have a daughter, Evolet, who was born in 2012 and Ellora, who was born in August, 2015. They currently live part of the year in Dunedin, New Zealand and part of the year in Queensland, Australia.

References

External links

New Zealand children's musicians
People from Mosgiel
People educated at Taieri College
Writers from Preston, Lancashire
New Zealand emigrants to the United Kingdom
1978 births
Living people
Musicians from Preston, Lancashire